James Norman Riley (May 25, 1895 – May 25, 1969) was a Canadian professional ice hockey and baseball player. The only person to play in both the National Hockey League (NHL) and Major League Baseball (MLB), Riley played nine games in the NHL in 1926–27 and six games in MLB between 1921 and 1923. In hockey he also played eight seasons in the Pacific Coast Hockey Association, a rival major league of the NHL, in a career that lased from 1915 to 1929. While in the PCHA he mainly played for the Seattle Metropolitans, and won the Stanley Cup in 1917. Riley's baseball career lasted 12 seasons from 1921 to 1932, and was mainly spent in the minor leagues.

Early life
Born in Bayfield, New Brunswick.

Career 
Riley played 17 games in the National Hockey League and 90 games in the Pacific Coast Hockey Association, as a member of the Chicago Black Hawks, Detroit Cougars, and Seattle Metropolitans. He won the Stanley Cup with Seattle in 1917. In 1922–23, he was named a PCHA First Team All-Star.

In addition, Riley played professional baseball for 12 seasons, from 1921 to 1932, mostly in the minor leagues. He started his career as a second baseman, and played in four games at that position for the 1921 St. Louis Browns of the American League, thus becoming the only athlete in sports history to play both Major League Baseball and in the National Hockey League. After that season, he switched permanently to first base, and returned to the major leagues with the 1923 Washington Senators, playing two games with them, before resuming his career in the minors. In six major league games, he was 0-for-14.

Personal life 
Riley died in Seguin, Texas, the day of his 74th birthday.

Career statistics

Regular season and playoffs

Notes

External links 

Jim Riley bio from seattlehockey.net, previously published in The National Pastime

1895 births
1969 deaths
Baseball people from New Brunswick
Baton Rouge Senators players
Canadian expatriate baseball players in the United States
Canadian ice hockey left wingers
Chicago Blackhawks players
Dallas Steers players
Detroit Cougars players
Fort Worth Panthers players
Ice hockey people from New Brunswick
Major League Baseball infielders
Major League Baseball players from Canada
Mobile Bears players
People from Westmorland County, New Brunswick
Salt Lake City Bees players
San Antonio Indians players
Seattle Metropolitans players
Shreveport Gassers players
St. Louis Browns players
Stanley Cup champions
Terre Haute Tots players
Topeka Senators players
Vancouver Beavers players
Washington Senators (1901–1960) players
Victoria Aristocrats players